John "Jack" Gilbert Graham (January 23, 1932 – January 11, 1957) was an American mass murderer who, on November 1, 1955, killed  44 people aboard United Airlines Flight 629 near Longmont, Colorado, using a dynamite time bomb. Graham planted the bomb in his mother's suitcase in an apparent move to murder her and claim $37,500 worth of life insurance money from policies he purchased in the airport terminal just before the flight departure.  Graham was charged with and convicted of the murder of his mother. He was sentenced to death and was executed by the state of Colorado in January 1957.

Background 
John Gilbert Graham was born on January 23, 1932, in Denver, Colorado, the child of Daisie Graham and her second husband. Nicknamed "Jack," Graham was Daisie's second child, as she already had a daughter from her first marriage. Graham was born during the height of the Great Depression, and, in 1937, his father died from pneumonia, causing Daisie to send the young Jack to an orphanage due to their poverty. In 1941, Daisie was married for the third time to Earl King, who died shortly after their marriage. Using her inheritance from King's death, Daisie became a successful businesswoman, but despite her newfound wealth, Daisie did not collect Graham from the orphanage. The two remained estranged until 1954, when Graham was 22 years old, and Daisie King was running a successful restaurant. After their reunion, King and Graham had a poor relationship, and were often witnessed arguing.

In 1955, shortly before the aircraft bombing, King's restaurant was destroyed in a suspicious gas explosion, believed to have been deliberately caused by Graham. Graham had insured the restaurant and collected on the property insurance following the explosion.

Bombing 
United Airlines Flight 629 was using a Douglas DC-6B airliner (named "Mainliner Denver") piloted by World War II veteran Lee Hall on the evening of November 1, 1955. The flight had originated at New York City's LaGuardia Airport, making a stop in Chicago before continuing to Denver; it then took off from Denver, Colorado's Stapleton Airfield, bound for Portland, Oregon, with continuing service to Seattle. Minutes after the plane's departure from Denver, the DC-6B exploded and the flaming wreckage fell to earth over tracts of farmland and sugar beet fields near Longmont, Colorado. There were no survivors.

Graham's mother had been a passenger on Flight 629, and was traveling to Alaska to visit her daughter, Graham's half-sister. At the time, flight insurance could be routinely purchased in vending machines at airports, until changes to the system in the 1980s.

Graham's apparent motive for the bombing was to claim $37,500 worth of life insurance money from policies he had purchased in the airport terminal just moments before the aircraft's departure.

Arrest and conviction 
Investigators discovered that Graham had a criminal record for embezzlement by check forgery, and illegal transport of whiskey for which he had served 60 days in a Texas prison.  They also determined that King's restaurant had been severely damaged by "a suspicious explosion" earlier that year, and that Graham had received the insurance settlement. Locals also suspected Graham of deliberately causing his new pick-up truck to be struck by a train that year, in order to collect the insurance. The FBI obtained use of a nearby barn where they re-assembled the fragments of the airplane collected from the site.  They were able to determine that explosives were used, and that they had come from certain items of luggage in the baggage compartment. Based on that evidence as well as interviews, contradictory statements, physical evidence found at Graham's house, and finally a confession, Graham was arrested and charged with sabotage. The charge was later changed to murder.

After Graham's arrest, Denver radio station KDEN owner Gene Amole and Rocky Mountain News photographer Morey Engle arranged to sneak a camera into the old Denver County Jail on West Colfax Avenue for an interview of Graham during a reunion with his wife Gloria. "I loved my mother very much", Graham told Amole. "She meant a lot to me. It's very hard for me to tell exactly how I feel. She left so much of herself behind."  When Amole asked him why he had signed a confession, he said the FBI had threatened to point out inconsistencies in statements made by his wife Gloria when she was interviewed by the authorities. "I was not about to let them touch her in any way, shape or form", he said. None of the Denver TV stations would agree to air the film, however. Amole said he believed it was because they feared it "might engender pretrial sympathy" for Graham.

The FBI, United Airlines and the district attorney wanted Graham tried, found guilty, and executed promptly as a "deterrent to others who might plan copycat murders", Amole wrote in a 1995 column in the Rocky Mountain News. Decades later, the footage was eventually aired on one of Denver's local PBS stations in a documentary called "Murder in Midair", produced by Don Kinney. However, Graham also confirmed on a number of occasions that he had made and set the bomb. When he described the bomb, he gave details that later were confirmed by investigators.  Graham also told prison doctors that he "realized that there were about 50 or 60 people carried on a DC6, but the number of people to be killed made no difference to me; it could have been a thousand. When their time comes, there is nothing they can do about it."

The trial that followed resulted in Colorado becoming the first state to officially sanction the use of television cameras to broadcast criminal trials.  There was no federal statute on the books at the time (1955) that made it a crime to blow up an airplane. Therefore, on the day after Graham's confession, the Colorado district attorney moved swiftly to prosecute Graham via the simplest possible route: premeditated murder of a single victim – his mother, Daisie King. Thus, despite the number of victims killed on Flight 629 along with Mrs King, Graham was charged with only one count of first-degree murder. As the case progressed, Graham quickly recanted his confession, but at his 1956 trial his defense was unable to counter the massive amount of evidence presented by the prosecution.  In February 1956, he attempted suicide in his cell, and was thereafter put under 24-hour surveillance. On May 5, 1956, Graham was convicted of the murder of his mother, Daisie King, and was sentenced to death.

Execution 
Graham was executed in the Colorado State Penitentiary gas chamber on January 11, 1957.

Fictional portrayals 
Graham was portrayed by Nick Adams in the 1959 motion picture The FBI Story starring James Stewart and Vera Miles.

The case was the basis for the 1960 "Fire in the Sky" episode of M Squad.

The case was the basis for the 1959 "Flight 169--Mass Murder" episode of Deadline (1959 TV series).

The book Mainliner Denver: The Bombing of Flight 629 by Andrew J. Field (Johnson Books, 2005) was published on the 50th anniversary of the bombing.

The case is the subject of the episode titled "Time Bomb" of the 2013 Investigation Discovery miniseries A Crime to Remember.

Music 
Macabre, a grindcore metal band from Chicago, wrote a song about Graham called "There Was a Young Man Who Blew Up a Plane", on their Sinister Slaughter album.

See also 
 Albert Guay
 Capital punishment in Colorado

References

External links 
 Mainliner Denver: The Bombing of Flight 629 by Andrew J. Field (Johnson Books, 2005)

1932 births
1957 deaths
20th-century executions of American people
20th-century executions by Colorado
American male criminals
American mass murderers
American murderers of children
American people executed for murder
Bombers (people)
Executed people from Colorado
Executed mass murderers
Matricides
Murderers for life insurance money
People convicted of murder by Colorado
People executed by Colorado by gas chamber
People from Denver